The Bahrain International Circuit is a  motorsport venue opened in 2004 and used for drag racing, GP2 Series (now FIA Formula 2), and the annual  Formula One Bahrain Grand Prix. The 2004 Grand Prix was the first held in the Middle East. Beginning in 2006, Australian V8 Supercars raced at the BIC, with the event known as the Desert 400. However, the V8 Supercars did not return for the 2011 V8 Supercar season. 24 Hour endurance races are also hosted at BIC. The circuit has a FIA Grade 1 license. The circuit also has multiple layouts.

History

The construction of the Bahrain circuit was a national objective for Bahrain, initiated by the Crown Prince, Shaikh Salman bin Hamad Al Khalifa. The Crown Prince is the Honorary President of the Bahrain Motor Federation. TRL was asked to build the circuit, headed by Patrick Brogan.

Race organizers were worried that the circuit would not be complete in time for the 2004 Bahrain Grand Prix and attempted to cancel the event; however, Formula One supremo Bernie Ecclestone refused this request. In the end, the circuit was not quite fully complete, but was good enough for the grand prix to go ahead.

After the 2004 race and ahead of the 2005 race the track was realigned at turn four, decreasing the circuit's overall length by 5 metres in total.

In  the circuit became the first Grand Prix circuit to be awarded the distinguished FIA Institute Centre of Excellence award, given for excellent safety, race marshal, and medical facilities, and for the high standards of technology required to maintain these.

In 2011 the circuit was scheduled to be the first GP of the season. However, due to civil unrest in the country the race had to be cancelled in March 2011. On 4 June the FIA announced that the race would be scheduled for 30 October, the original slot for the inaugural Indian Grand Prix, which would be shifted to a season-closing date on 11 December. However, two days later following concerns from teams and other officials, the race organizers officially cancelled the race, choosing to focus their attention on the 2012 running. The 2012 Formula One calendar had the race scheduled for 22 April, the fourth of the season.

Construction and design
The circuit was designed by German architect Hermann Tilke, the same architect who designed the Sepang International Circuit in Malaysia. The main contractor for the project was Cebarco-WCT. The circuit cost approximately 56.2 million Bahraini Dinars (US$150 million) to construct. It has six separate tracks, including a test oval and a drag strip.

The circuit posed a unique problem. Positioned in the middle of a desert, there were worries that sand would blow onto the circuit and disrupt the race. However, organizers were able to keep the sand off the track by spraying an adhesive on the sand around the track.

The surface of the track is made of graywacke aggregate, shipped to Bahrain from Bayston Hill quarry in Shropshire, England.  The surface material is highly acclaimed by circuit bosses and Formula 1 drivers for the high level of grip it offers. The same aggregate material is used at the Yas Marina Circuit, venue of the Abu Dhabi Grand Prix.

Shortly after the Formula One February 2014 testing, the first corner of the track was renamed after seven-time champion German driver Michael Schumacher in honour of his achievements and also in support after he suffered an almost fatal skiing accident late December 2013.

Layouts

A lap in a Formula One car

The DRS zone is on the pit straight at the Bahrain Grand Prix (starting 2012), so turn 1 ("Michael Schumacher turn") is the prime overtaking opportunity. The corner itself is incredibly tight; a typical F1 car must brake approximately  before the corner and shift right down to gear one. The width of the track further adds to the overtaking possibilities.
Turns 2 and 3 are flat out and gaining a good exit can set up an overtaking opportunity into turn 4. The straight leading to turn 4 is very long with a DRS zone, and the track at the corner itself is incredibly wide, at about thirty metres. Turns 5, 6 and 7 make up a high-speed left-right-left "S" section that leads into turn 8, a right-hand hairpin where taking a wide line can avoid the bump on the apex which unsettles the car. The back straight leads down into turns 11, 12 and 13, a medium-speed complex of corners. Turn 11 is a fourth-gear left hander that leads immediately into the flat-out right hander of 12, then the third gear right-hander of turn 13 which requires a good exit to gain speed down the following straight. It is worth braking quite early for turn 14 to gain speed down the main straight. If you brake about  before the apex then it is easy to keep it tidy through the slow right hander and you can also put the power down early, and gain speed all the way through turn 15 and the main straight (which is the DRS zone).

The lap record (which only accounts for laps set in a race) on the current layout of the Grand Prix circuit was set in 2005 by Pedro de la Rosa at 1:31.447, in what was the only fastest lap in his 104-race career. Michael Schumacher set a faster time of 1:30.252 at the 2004 edition of the race, but alterations to turn 4 of the track meant that it was counted as a different layout from 2005 onwards. The fastest time ever set at the track was produced by Lewis Hamilton during qualifying for the 2020 edition at 1:27.264, beating the previous record by Charles Leclerc, set during qualifying for the 2019 edition (1:27.866).

Facilities

Formula One Grand Prix

The first Bahrain Grand Prix took place on 4 April 2004, making history as the first Formula One Grand Prix to be held in the Middle East. Bahrain fought off fierce competition from elsewhere in the region to stage the race, with Egypt, Lebanon and the United Arab Emirates (UAE) all hoping for the prestige of hosting a Formula One Grand Prix (the UAE would host a Grand Prix from 2009).

The Bahrain Grand Prix is usually the third race on the Formula One calendar, apart from the 2006 season, when Bahrain swapped places with the traditional opener, the Australian Grand Prix, which was pushed back to avoid a clash with the Commonwealth Games. In , Bahrain was moved to the fourth race. For the  season Bahrain was again the pre-season testing and season opener and Formula One cars drove the full  "Endurance Circuit" to celebrate F1's 'diamond jubilee'. For 2011 however F1 was set to return to racing on the original layout used between 2004 and 2009. The race was postponed and finally cancelled due to protests in the country but F1 returned to the track for the 2012 Bahrain Grand Prix. 2014 saw the track host its first ever Grand Prix under lights, as the race was scheduled as a night race to celebrate the tenth year of Formula 1 at the circuit. Subsequent editions of the race have also been held at night. In 2020 the circuit hosted two Grands Prix, the Bahrain and Sakhir Grands Prix, after the calendar was revised following the COVID-19 pandemic with the second using an alternative layout.

Series hosted
The Bahrain International Circuit hosts a number of high-profile series, including the FIA Formula One World Championship, the FIA World Endurance Championship, the FIA Formula 2 Championship, FIA Formula 3 Championship, and Porsche Sprint Challenge Middle East.

In the past the circuit has hosted the FIA GT Championship, Speedcar Series, Australian V8 Supercars, GP2 Asia Series, and a one-off Bahrain Superprix involving Formula Three cars, following on from the collapsed Korea Super Prix. The first ever Formula BMW World Final took place in Bahrain.

Events

 Current

 January: Bahrain ProAm 1000, Bahrain International Circuit 2000cc Challenge
 February: Bahrain International Circuit 2000cc Challenge
 March: Formula One Bahrain Grand Prix, FIA Formula 2 Championship Sakhir Formula 2 round, FIA Formula 3 Championship, Porsche Sprint Challenge Middle East
 April: Bahrain International Circuit 2000cc Challenge
 November: FIA World Endurance Championship 8 Hours of Bahrain, Porsche Sprint Challenge Middle East

 Former

 Bahrain Superprix (2004)
 Ferrari Challenge Asia-Pacific (2020)
 Ferrari Challenge Europe (2019)
 FIA GT Championship Bahrain Supercar 500 (2005)
 FIA GT Nations Cup (2018)
 Formula BMW Asia (2004–2005)
 Formula BMW World Final (2005)
 Formula One Sakhir Grand Prix (2020)
 Gulf 12 Hours (2021)
 GP2 Series Bahrain GP2 round (2005, 2007, 2012–2015)
 GP2 Asia Series (2008–2010)
 GP3 Series (2015)
 MRF Challenge Formula 2000 Championship (2013–2019)
 Porsche Supercup (2006–2010, 2012)
 Speedcar Series (2008–2009)
 TCR International Series (2016–2017)
 TCR Middle East Series (2017–2018)
 V8 Supercars Desert 400 (2006–2008, 2010)
 World Series Formula V8 3.5 (2017)
 World Touring Car Cup FIA WTCR Race of Bahrain

Lap records

As of March 2023, the fastest official race lap records at the Bahrain International Circuit are listed as:

See also
 Bahrain Grand Prix
 Sakhir Grand Prix
 List of Formula One circuits

Notes

References

External links

 

Formula One circuits
Bahrain Grand Prix
Motorsport venues in Bahrain
Drag racing venues
World Touring Car Championship circuits
Supercars Championship circuits
Racing circuits designed by Hermann Tilke
2004 establishments in Bahrain